Smoky or Smokey may refer to:

People
 Smoky Babe (1927–1975), American acoustic blues guitarist and singer born Robert Brown
 Smoky Burgess (1927–1991), American Major League Baseball catcher
 Smoky Dawson (1913–2008), Australian country music performer born Herbert Brown
 Henry Harris (ice hockey) (1905-1975), Canadian hockey player
 Smoky Owens (1912-1942), American baseball pitcher in the Negro leagues
 Smokey Robinson (born 1940), American R&B singer and songwriter
 Smokey Rogers, American Western swing musician Eugene Rogers (1917–1993)
 Ernest Smith (1914–2005), Canadian recipient of the Victoria Cross
 Smoky Joe Wood (1889–1985), American Major League Baseball pitcher
 Smokey Yunick (1923–2001), NASCAR designer
 Lois Smoky (1907–1981), Kiowa painter

Places
 Smoky Cape, Australia
 Smoky Dome, a mountain in Idaho
 Smoky Group, a Canadian geologic formation
 Smoky Hills, central United States
 Smoky Lake (Blaine County, Idaho)
 Smoky Mountain (disambiguation)
 Smoky Point, Alaska
 Smoky Range, a small mountain range in Montana
 Smoky River, Alberta, Canada
 Smoky Township, Sherman County, Kansas

Arts and entertainment
 Smoky, the title character of Smoky the Cowhorse, a Newbery Medal-winning novel by Will James, and its adaptations:
 Smoky (1933 film), starring Victor Jory
 Smoky (1946 film), starring Fred MacMurray
 Smoky (1966 film), starring Fess Parker
 Smokey (album), by Smokey Robinson
 Smokey, a character from the film Friday (1995)
 Smokey, a character from the film The Big Lebowski (1998)
Smokie (band), an English band formerly known as Smokey

Other uses
 Smokey Bear, mascot of the United States Forest Service
 Smoky (dog), a war dog in World War II
 Smokey (mascot), mascot of the University of Tennessee
 Smokey, CB slang for a highway patrolman

See also
 Old Smoky (disambiguation)
 Great Smoky Mountains, on the Tennessee–North Carolina border
 Little Smoky River, Alberta, Canada
 Little Smoky Valley, Nevada
 Smokey Joe (disambiguation)
 Smokie (disambiguation)

Lists of people by nickname